This is a list of members of the House of Assembly of the Australian state of Tasmania between the 29 March 1906 election and the 30 April 1909 election.

This proved to be the last term of single-member representation, which had served the House for over half a century since its first elections in September 1856. In 1907, a redistribution adopted the five federal electorates which had been created for Tasmania, and used the Hare-Clark proportional representation system to elect six members to each of the seats. The changes became effective at the 1909 election.

The 1906 election resulted in three more Labor members being elected—although one was replacing Labor-turned-Independent member William Lamerton. As most of the retiring or defeated members were Independents, this had little impact on the party balance and enabled John Evans to continue as Premier of Tasmania throughout the term.

Notes
  In May 1906, Ministerial member George Leatham resigned as part of an agreement to terminate a legal challenge from Julian Brown, the previous MP who Leatham had defeated at the election. Leatham won the resulting by-election on 25 June 1906.
  On 1 November 1906, the Labor member for Queenstown, George Mason Burns, resigned. Labor candidate Benjamin Watkins was elected unopposed on 19 November 1906. At 22, he was the youngest member of the Parliament.

Sources
 
 Parliament of Tasmania (2006). The Parliament of Tasmania from 1856

Members of Tasmanian parliaments by term
20th-century Australian politicians